The 1890 Pittsburgh Alleghenys season was the ninth season for the Pittsburgh Pirates franchise. The team finished eighth and last in the National League with a record of 23–113, 66.5 games behind the Brooklyn Bridegrooms. This was the final season for the team with the name "Alleghenys", as the team changed their name to the Pittsburgh Pirates the next season. They have had this name ever since. 

For all intents and purposes, the Alleghenys' season ended when most of their stars defected to the Pittsburgh Burghers of the Players' League.  With a decimated roster, the Alleghenys made a wretched showing.  The 113 losses by the Alleghenys set a new major league record, breaking the old record of 111 set the previous year by the Louisville Colonels. 
The record would stand until 1899, when the Cleveland Spiders lost 134 games, the all-time record.

Poor attendances meant that they played 97 of their 136 games on the road, finishing with a road record of 9-88 (the 88 losses remained a record until 1899, and is unreachable under current MLB scheduling rules, which allow a maximum of 81 road games). Their .093 road winning percentage is the lowest in MLB history for a minimum of 60 games. This would be the last time the Pittsburgh franchise reached the century mark in the loss column until 1917, when the team was known as the Pittsburgh Pirates.

Regular season

Season standings

Record vs. opponents

Opening Day lineup

Roster

Player stats

Batting

Starters by position 
Note: Pos = Position; G = Games played; AB = At bats; H = Hits; Avg. = Batting average; HR = Home runs; RBI = Runs batted in

Other batters 
Note: G = Games played; AB = At bats; H = Hits; Avg. = Batting average; HR = Home runs; RBI = Runs batted in

Pitching

Starting pitchers 
Note: G = Games pitched; IP = Innings pitched; W = Wins; L = Losses; ERA = Earned run average; SO = Strikeouts

Other pitchers 
Note: G = Games pitched; IP = Innings pitched; W = Wins; L = Losses; ERA = Earned run average; SO = Strikeouts

Relief pitchers 
Note: G = Games pitched; W = Wins; L = Losses; SV = Saves; ERA = Earned run average; SO = Strikeouts

References 
 1890 Pittsburgh Alleghenys team page at Baseball Reference
 1890 Pittsburgh Alleghenys Page at Baseball Almanac

Pittsburgh Pirates seasons
Pittsburgh Alleghenys season
Pittsburg Pir